American Manners is a 1924 American silent drama film directed by James W. Horne. It was produced by Richard Talmadge, who also stars, and was distributed by FBO.

Preserved in the Library of Congress.

Plot

Cast
 Richard Talmadge as Roy Thomas
 Mark Fenton as Dan Thomas
 Lee Shumway as Clyde Harven
 Helen Lynch as Gloria Winthrop
 Arthur Millett as Conway
 William H. Turner as Jonas Winthrop
 Pat Harmon as Mike Barclay
 George Warde as Bud (a waif)

References

External links
 
 

1924 films
1924 drama films
Silent American drama films
American silent feature films
American black-and-white films
Film Booking Offices of America films
Films directed by James W. Horne
Surviving American silent films
1920s American films
1920s English-language films